Charles Abbott may refer to:
Charles Abbott, 1st Baron Tenterden (1762–1832), English jurist
Charles Abbott, 3rd Baron Tenterden (1834–1882), British diplomat
Charles Conrad Abbott (1843–1919), American archaeologist and naturalist 
Charles Lydiard Aubrey Abbott (1886–1975), Administrator of the Northern Territory of Australia
Charles Abbott (footballer) (born 1939), Australian rules footballer
Charles Abbott (cricketer) (1815–1889), English lawyer and cricketer
Sir Charles Abbott (Australian politician) (1889–1960), member of the South Australian House of Assembly, judge
Charles Abbott (bowls) (1867-?), South African lawn bowls international

See also
Charles Abbot (disambiguation)